The 1892 All-Ireland Senior Football Championship was the sixth staging of Ireland's premier Gaelic football knock-out competition. Dublin were the champions, becoming the first county to retain the title.

This was the first championship in which players from any part of a county (rather than just the county champions) could play on the county team. Other important rule changes were also introduced: the goal was made worth 5 points (previously, a goal was worth more than any number of points) and teams were reduced from 21-a-side to 17.

Results

Connacht Championship
Roscommon were the only entrant, so they received a bye to the All-Ireland semi-final.

Leinster Championship

Munster Championship

Ulster Championship
There were no entrants from Ulster.

All-Ireland Championship

Championship statistics

Miscellaneous
 Dublin become the first county to win the All Ireland title for second year in a row.

References

All-Ireland Senior Football Championship